Pauline Dy Phon (ប៉ូលីន ឌី ផុន) (1933-21 May 2010) was a Cambodian botanist who specialized in the flora of Southeast Asia.

Coming to study in France, she obtained her license in 1959 at the Faculty of Sciences in Paris. She became a teacher and researcher at the University of Phnom Penh, though in 1975 she was forced to stop work because the Khmer Rouge came to power. In 1980, she managed to flee to France and work in the Botanical Laboratory of the National Museum of Natural History. In the same institution she contributed significantly to identifying and classifying plants of Cambodia and Indochina, which remain relatively unknown. In 1980 she was awarded the Prix de Coincy by the Académie des Sciences. She published a 915-page directory of the Dictionary of plants used in Cambodia in 2000.

References

Cambodian botanists
1933 births
2010 deaths
Cambodian emigrants to France
Women botanists